The 2022–23 DHB-Pokal is the 46th edition of the tournament.

Round 1
The draw was held on 28 June 2022. The matches will be played between 26 and 29 August 2022. The teams were split into a north and south group. All 2021–22 Handball-Bundesliga teams received a bye.

Round 2
The draw was held on 31 August 2022. The matches were played on 19, 20 October, 2 and 22 November 2022.

Round of 16
The draw was held on 21 October 2022. The matches were played on 21 and 22 December 2022.

Quarterfinals
The draw took place on 23 December 2022. The matches were played on 4 and 5 February 2023.

Final four
The draw took place on 8 February 2023. The matches will be played on 15 and 16 April 2023 at the Lanxess Arena, Cologne.

Bracket

Semifinals

Third place game

Final

References

External links
Official website

2022